Mike Leigh is an English filmmaker.

He has received seven Academy Award nominations, and thirteen British Academy Film Award nominations receiving three awards for Secrets and Lies (1996) and Vera Drake (2004). In 2014 he received the BAFTA Fellowship for Outstanding British Contribution to Film. He has also received five Independent Spirit Award nominations for Best International Film winning for Secrets & Lies.

He has also received various award nominations from film festivals including eight nominations from the Cannes Film Festival winning four awards including the Palme d'Or for Secrets & Lies as well as awards for Naked, and Another Year. He also received three nominations from the Berlin International Film Festival winning twice for his Meantime and The Short & Curlies. At the Venice International Film Festival he received five nominations winning the prestigious Golden Lion award for Topsy-Turvy and Vera Drake.

Major associations

Academy Awards

British Academy Film Awards

Independent Spirit Awards

Festivals

Berlin Film Festival

Cannes Film Festival

Venice Film Festival

References 

Lists of awards received by film director